Womble Hollow is a valley in Iron County in the U.S. state of Missouri, north of Sawyer School.

Womble Hollow has the name of the local Womble family.

References

Valleys of Iron County, Missouri
Valleys of Missouri